Nicholas Kendall may refer to:

 Nicholas Kendall (Conservative politician) (1800–1878), MP for East Cornwall
 Nicholas Kendall (priest) (died 1739/40), Bishop of Crediton and Bishop of Plymouth
 Nicholas Kendall (Royalist) (1577–1643), MP for Lostwithiel